On October 5–6, 2010, a destructive series of thunderstorms struck Arizona, resulting in the state's largest tornado outbreak and its costliest weather disaster on record. Spawned by a nearby cold-core low, successive hailstorms in Phoenix and surrounding locations on October 5 caused damage to thousands of homes, businesses, and vehicles. The following day, a record 12 tornadoes were recorded, multiple strong/EF2 or greater on the Enhanced Fujita scale and many in close proximity to one another; this included two tornadoes rated EF3. Thunderstorms on both days caused significant flash flooding which inundated businesses, stranded vehicles, and closed roadways. Damage throughout the state reached $4.9 billion, including $2.7 billion in insured loss from just hail damage, the costliest weather event on record in Arizona. Some impacts occurred in California, Nevada, and Utah as well as the cold-core remained stationary over several days.

Meteorological synopsis
In 2008, researchers examined the overlap between large-scale environments responsible for producing tornadoes in Northern Arizona. They utilized 38 days between 1950–2006 that involved the formation of classic supercell thunderstorms and confirmed tornadoes across the state. Of those 38 days, researchers found a similar meteorological progression in half of them. The overlapping setup involved the approach of a cold-core low and a favorable placement of the warm sector across Arizona. The approach of these mid- to upper-level lows, detached from the jet stream, allowed for southerly wind vectors to overspread the state. This not only afforded the wind shear necessary for tornadic development, but also provided a supply of warm, moist subtropical air. Compared to previously analyzed tornado environments across the United States, researchers found that Northern Arizona events typically featured marginal instability, averaging around 450 J/kg.

On October 5, 2010, the dominant pattern across the United States bore resemblance to the setups described in previous research. An omega block existed across the country, so named for its uncharacteristically persistent weather conditions across the country on the scale of days to weeks. This omega block was characterized by a high-pressure area over the Central United States and two separate cold-core lows over California and West Virginia. As the western low remained nearly stationary, an unstable atmosphere began to develop across Arizona, prompting the Storm Prediction Center (SPC) to outline a Slight risk across the state. Southeasterly winds at the surface intersected the dryline, providing the impetus for thunderstorm development. A cluster of strong thunderstorms developed across the Phoenix, Arizona, metropolitan area, contributing to a severe hail event there. While this activity also produced sporadic straight-line wind damage, a more robust event into the evening hours was hindered by the loss of daytime heating and the departure of favorable dynamics for severe storm development.

By the morning of October 6, forecasters anticipated only a marginal risk of severe weather across Arizona. While instability was expected to climb around 500–1,000 J/kg throughout the afternoon hours, favorable dynamics were expected to shift away from the state and instead be replaced by sinking air aloft. However, as the pre-dawn hours progressed, the overarching cold-core low over California began to retrograde toward the west-northwest. This prolonged the duration of an unstable environment across Arizona, and the SPC once again issued a Slight risk across Arizona accordingly. While large hail and damaging winds were expected to be the primary threats, an isolated tornado risk was also outlined. However, as a well-defined piece of energy rotated around the base of the cold-core low, a more significant tornado event than expected materialized. Rounds of supercells developed across Northern Arizona, producing 11 confirmed tornadoes, the most on record in one day in Arizona and, along with an additional tornado in Utah, the highest number of tornadoes on record in a single event west of the Continental Divide. Many of these tornadoes were strong, EF2 or higher on the Enhanced Fujita scale. One noteworthy aspect of the event is that every tornadic supercell began to show signs of rotation south of the Mogollon Rim, but none of them produced confirmed tornadoes until after they tracked over that geological feature. This strongly suggests that the mountainous terrain had a significant influence on the development of tornadoes that day. Since these supercells moved along a north-south orientation, they not only produced tornadoes in very close proximity to one another, but also contributed to flash flooding throughout the region. Additional severe thunderstorms overspread Utah, Colorado, and Wyoming into afternoon hours before the event subsided.

Confirmed tornadoes

October 6 event

Non-tornadic effects
During the afternoon hours of October 5, a series of severe hailstorms affected Maricopa County, Arizona. These tennis ball sized hail stones damaged hundreds of roofs and vehicles, in addition to damaging dozens of aircraft at the Scottsdale Airport. The most substantial event of the day occurred with a storm that moved from Firebird Lake to south of Chandler into northern Glendale and finally across southern Peoria. In northwestern Phoenix and Glendale, this hailstorm compounded the effects of the earlier event. One person was injured by large hail on a football practice field. Thirty-four skylights at the St. Mary's Food Bank in Phoenix were punctured, allowing heavy rainfall to flow into the structure. Approximately 20 percent of the food inventory was ruined, equating to about 1.4 million meals. In total, more than 150,000 homes were damaged throughout Maricopa County, forcing thousands of insurance claims. The estimated size of the hail that struck the county was the third largest in Arizona history, and its estimated cost reached $2.7 billion in insured damages, the costliest weather disaster on record in the state.

The stalled cold-core low produced heavy rainfall across the broader Nevada, Utah, Arizona, and California region. The Western Regional Climate Center in Reno, Nevada, received  in just one hour, one of the greatest hourly rainfall rates on record at that location. Flash flooding converged into the Hualapai Canyon and moved toward the village of Supai, Arizona. In advance of the flood, 143 campers were airlifted to safety. Three tribal pack animals were killed in the village. The canyon was indefinitely closed to tourists following damage to the trail and campground. President Barack Obama declared the Havasupai Canyon a major disaster area and offered federal aid to assist in local recovery efforts. The cost to replace the affected instructure reached $1.63 million. Heavy rains caused the roof of a structure to collapse in southwestern Phoenix. In Clark County, Nevada, an  wall of water pushed into the Callville Bay Marina, destroying most of that structure, rendering many roads impassable, and destroying multiple power poles and cross arms. In numerous cases throughout the region, multiple feet of water washed over roadways, disrupting travel, washing away routes, or stranding vehicles. Additional roads were closed by fallen rocks. In Kern County, California, debris flows flowed into several businesses, forcing their closure for many hours. Two 17-year-old boys were struck by lightning in St. George, Utah, and taken to the hospital in critical condition; they were later expected to make a full recovery. Lightning in Tolleson, Arizona, caused a residential structure fire as well. The totality of severe weather in Arizona on October 5–6 reached $4.9 billion.

See also
 Tornadoes of 2010

Notes

References

External links
 Video of the hailstorm in Phoenix

F3 tornadoes by date
Arizona
Hailstorms
Tornado outbreaks
Tornado, 2010-10-06, Arizona
2010 in Arizona
Arizona tornado outbreak
Tornadoes of 2010